Federico de Moyúa y Salazar (17 June 1873 - 7 March 1939) was a Spanish politician who served as the mayor of Bilbao.

Biography 
Moyúa was a member of a wealthy liberal family, both his father and grandfather served in the Third Carlist War. He studied law at the University of Deusto and practiced only for a few years. 

A member of the Liberal Fusionist Party, he was elected mayor in 1910, and was succeeded by Benito Marco Gardoqui in 1913. He served again in 1924, during the Dictatorship of Primo de Rivera, until 1930.

During his term, he promoted infrastructure.

Moyúa tried to expand Bilbao by incorporating the municipalities on the banks of the estuary, but was ultimately unachieved.

Moyúa Plaza in Bilbao is dedicated to his name.

Decoration 

 Order of Isabella the Catholic (1925)

References

External links 
Relación de alcaldes de Bilbao, Ayuntamiento de Bilbao

Moyúa
Mayors of Bilbao
1873 births
1939 deaths